Hilite Mall (stylized as HiLITE Mall) is a shopping mall located in the city of Kozhikode in the Malabar region of Kerala.The shopping mall covers a total built-up area of  with  of retail space. The mall location is very close to the IT Parks (Government & ULCCS), which gives decent footfall during weekdays as well. The mall is being constructed in two phases, phase 1 is complete and phase 2 is under construction. Phase 2 will include an eight screen multiplex cinema and NESTO Hypermarket chain. There are outlets of many well known brands, a food court, supermarkets, department stores as well as various avenues for entertainment.

Facilities
 200+ branded retail outlets with Lifestyle, Max, Pantaloons, people etc.
 Nesto Hypermarket 
 Centralized A/C
 32 Escalators, 18 elevators, 4 Travelators
 Food court with various options like KFC, Chicking, Dominos, Salkara Restaurant (Paragon Group) etc.
 Popular gaming and entertainment zone like snow fantasy, football turf etc.
 Underground pay parking
 ATM

Gallery

References

External links

 http://www.business-standard.com/india/news/hilite-plans-rs-600-cr-integrated-township-at-kozhikode/452205/
 https://archive.today/20130216061525/http://news.indiamart.com/story/hilite-city-scheduled-be-completed-by-2013-148116.html
 http://www.thehindu.com/todays-paper/tp-national/tp-kerala/article3690304.ece
 http://www.cyberparktoday.com/kozhikode-city/kozhikode-shopping-malls/kozhikode-shopping-malls-calicut-malls-multiplexes/
 http://www.hilitebuilders.com/project/hilite-mall/
 https://hilitemall.com/about

Buildings and structures in Kozhikode
2015 establishments in Kerala
Shopping malls in Kerala